

1920s

LGBT
1920s in LGBT history
1920s
1920s
LGBT